Roman and the Four Steps was a popular band in Hong Kong in the 1960s.

Career
The band was noteworthy for singing in English and often singing British and American songs.  Roman Tam would eventually leave the band and enter the cantopop genre solo where he would eventually be labelled the "Godfather of Cantopop" after his death.

Discography
 Reflections of Charlie Brown b/w I Just Can't Wait (1967)
 Day Dream b/w Cathy Come Home (1969)

References

External links
 Official Website

Hong Kong musical groups
Chinese musical groups
English-language singers from Hong Kong